Leucopatus is a genus of velvet worm in the family Peripatopsidae, containing a single species, the blind velvet worm (Leucopatus anophthalmus). It is found in northeast Tasmania, Australia, and is ovoviviparous.

Taxonomy 
The generic name Leucopatus refers to the species' white colouration. The specific name anophthalmus refers to this species' lack of eyes.

Description 
The body is entirely white except for the tips of claws and jaws, which are dark brown. There are 15 pairs of oncopods. Adults are typically 25–30 mm long, but may extend to 50 mm while walking. Most distinctively, this species lacks eyes.
Typical habitat is beneath stones and rotten logs in sclerophyllous forests and shrubland.

Conservation 

Leucopatus anophthalmus is listed as Endangered on the IUCN Red List.

References 

Animals described in 1991
Blind onychophorans
Endangered fauna of Australia
IUCN-assessed onychophorans
Onychophorans of Australasia
Onychophoran genera
Taxonomy articles created by Polbot